The Faculty of Astrological Studies (FAS; founded 7 June 1948) is a UK-based school of astrology which in its over sixty years of existence has enrolled more than 10,000 students from ninety countries.

History

The Faculty of Astrological Studies was founded on 7 June 1948 under the auspices of the Astrological Lodge of London, for the purpose of advancing the understanding of the astrological tradition and producing practicing astrologers of integrity. Its founding members were Charles E. O. Carter, Edmund Casselli, Margaret Hone, and Lorenze von Sommaruga. The Faculty became independent of the Lodge in 1954. Its first Principal was the British astrologer Charles Carter, who was supported by his friend and FAS fellow-council member John Addey. Carter remained in the post of president until 1954, when he was succeeded by Margaret Hone, and later by Jeff Mayo in 1969 and by Julia Parker in 1973. Two of its former tutors, Liz Greene and Howard Sasportas, went on to found the Centre for Psychological Astrology in London in 1983.

Original objectives
In the 'Prospectus and Brief Syllabus of the Faculty of Astrological Studies' issued in August 1948, the objectives of the Faculty were set out as follows:

The Faculty of Astrological Studies has been founded by the Astrological Lodge of London as an independent examining body in all astrological subjects. It is a non profit making organisation having as its functions:
1) the drawing up of a syllabus of astrological subjects of a high standard;
2) the instituting of courses of tuition;
3) the preparation and holding of examinations in astrology, both of intermediate and final standards.

The Faculty of Astrological Studies today
The Faculty of Astrological Studies runs training courses by distance learning or classes in London. Its syllabus is reputed to be "rigorous" and includes a study of "history, astronomy, psychology, counselling methods, and every kind of astrological technique". Holders of its diploma are required to sign its Code of Ethics. It also holds an annual Summer School in Oxford.

The Faculty is a member of the Advisory Panel on Astrological Education.

Patrons
The present patrons are Robert Hand, Liz Greene, Baldur Ebertin, Julia Parker and Melanie Reinhart.

References

External links
 FAS website

Astrological organizations
1948 establishments in the United Kingdom
Organizations established in 1948
Educational organisations based in the United Kingdom